Vép is a town in Vas county, Hungary.

External links 
 Street map

References

Populated places in Vas County